Robert Thaddeus Taylor (1925–2006) was an American producer, director and founder of the Shakespeare Society of America.

Taylor
Robert Thaddeus Taylor was born August 29, 1925, in Wendell, Idaho.
Known as Thad Taylor, he was a founder of the Shakespeare Society of America in 1968, which built  a mini replica of Shakespeare's Globe Theatre in West Hollywood, California. It was dedicated to the production of classical plays.
Taylor's Globe staged all of the plays in Shakespeare's first folio at the playhouse as well as productions of Shakespeare Apocrypha like The Birth of Merlin, The Puritan and Sir John Oldcastle, the latter production directed by Taylor himself in 1986, and non-Shakespearean classics like The Alchemist. Among the awards Taylor received were the Los Angeles Drama Critics Circle Award (shared with DeVeren Bookwalter) for his production of Cyrano de Bergerac and the Drama-Logue Award for his direction of Hamlet.

Taylor died on October 5, 2006 in Los Angeles, California.

Shakespeare Society of America
The artifacts, archives and memorabilia from Hollywood's Globe Theatre and the Shakespeare Society of America were moved to Moss Landing, California in 2007.  This collection includes the work, notes books, and photographs of Taylor. This collection is on public display at 7981 Moss Landing Road in Moss Landing.
 the president of the society was Terry Taylor, nephew of the founder.

References

1925 births
2006 deaths
American theatre directors
American theatre managers and producers
People from Wendell, Idaho